Stathis Psaltis (27 February 1951 – 21 April 2017) was a Greek cinema, TV and theatre comic actor. He was best known for starring in many 1980s films, as many as four a year. He has been called "iconic" and a "household name".

Early life
He was born in Velo, Corinthia where he lived during his childhood until the age of 11, when his family moved to Aigaleo.

He studied at the acting school of Kostis Michailidis and finished the law school of the university of Athens.

Career
He starred in a lot of Greek films and also in theater. He became popular in the 1980s with commercial movies that included "Kamikazi agapi mou", "Troxonomos Varvara", "Ta kamakia", "Vasika Kalispera sas", "Kai o protos matakias", "Trellos eimai oti thelo kano", "Ela na agapithoume darling", and "Mantepse ti kano ta vradia".

Death
He died in Aghios Savas hospital in Athens from lung cancer on 21 April 2017.

Personal life
He was married to Christina, and had a daughter, Maria.

Filmography 

Diamantia sto gymno sou soma (1972) ... aka Diamantia sto gymno kormi tis (Greece: TV title)
"Emporoi ton ethnon, Oi" (1973) TV Series .... Joker
Paidia tis piatsas, Ta (1979)
Fadarines, Oi (1979) ... aka Οι Φανταρίνες (Greece)
"Symvolaiografos, O" (1979) TV Series .... Panagiotis Merkatos
Podogyros, O (1980)
Parthenokynigos, O (1980)
Madepse ti kano ta bradia (1980) .... Kosmas Papakosmas
Kotsos stin EOK, O (1980)
Gefsi apo Ellada! (1980)
Trohonomos Varvara (1981)
Pame gia kafe? (1981)
Kotsos exo apo to NATO, O (1981)
Kamakia, Ta (1981)
Eisai stin EOK, pathe gia tin EOK (1981) ... aka Eisai stin EOK, mathe gia tin EOK
Vasika... kalispera sas (1982) .... Efstathios Koubaris... aka Radiopeirates, Oi
Sainia, Ta (1982) .... Sissifos
Periergos, O (1982) .... Simos
Kai... o protos matakias (1982)
Pes ta Chrisostome (1983)
Kamikazi, agapi mou (1983) .... Efstathios Sgouros
Trelos eimai, oti thelo kano (1984) .... Michalis Vidas
Ela na... gymnothoume, darling (1984) .... Stathis... aka Ela n' agapithoume, darling
Rakos... no. 14, kai o protos bounakias (1985) .... Iraklis Spinos... aka Rakos No. 14
Psilos, lignos kai pseftaros (1985)
Kleftroni kai gentleman (1986) .... Stathis Ledoakridis... aka Κλεφτρόνι και tζέντλεμαν (Greece)
Kavalaris ton FM Stereo, O (1986) .... Stathis Papastathis
Xenodoheio kastri (1987)
Pantachou paron (1987)
Kivernisseis peftoune alla o Psaltis menei, I (1987) (V) .... Mantis Kalhas
Megalos paramythas, O (1988)
Kai deilos kai tolmiros (1988) .... Markos Tremoulas
Enas, alla... leon (1988) .... Stathis
Akatamahitos pilotos (1988) (V) (An Irresistible pilot)
Treladiko polyteleias (1989) .... Stathis Ksetripis (The Luxurious Nuthouse)
Protaris batsos kai i troteza, O (1989)
Apagogi sta tyfla (1989) .... Stathis (The Blind Kidnapping)
Erastis, O (1990) (V) .... Stathis Birbitsolis (The Lover)
Kalimera zoe (1994) TV Series
Kotes (2003)
An m'agapas (2006) TV Series .... Dimitris Marnis
Achristos, atalantos, asximos alla diashmos (2007) .... Himself
Ta Thelei o.....Kolotravas Mas (2007)
Oi Prasines, Oi Kokkines, Oi Thalassies oi Tsouxtres (2008)
Nou Dou oi Asximi (2008)
Pou Pas Re Giorgaki me tetoio Kairo (2011)

References

External links

1951 births
2017 deaths
20th-century Greek male actors
21st-century Greek male actors
Greek male actors
Greek male film actors
Greek male stage actors
Greek male television actors
Deaths from lung cancer in Greece
Greek male comedians
People from Velo